Persikubar stands for Persatuan Sepak bola Indonesia Kutai Barat (en: Football Association of Indonesia of West Kutai). Persikubar West Kutai was an Indonesian football club based in West Kutai Regency, East Kalimantan. Club was played in Liga Indonesia First Division.

Persikubar stadium named Swalas Gunaq Stadium. Its location was in downtown Sendawar, West Kutai.

References

External links
Persikubar Kutai Barat at Liga-Indonesia.co.id

west Kutai Regency
Football clubs in Indonesia
2010 disestablishments in Indonesia
Association football clubs disestablished in 2010
Defunct football clubs in Indonesia